Monreal (Basque: Elo) is a town and municipality located in the province and autonomous community of Navarre, northern Spain. It had a population of 295 in 2002. It lies on the old Aragonese pilgrim's road to Santiago de Compostela, a tributary path of the Way of St James.

History

In 1185 Berengaria of Navarre was given the fief of Monreal by her father Sancho VI of Navarre, possibly to enhance her status in view of her betrothal to Richard I of England.

Geography

La Higa sits to the west.

Demography 
From:INE Archiv

Notes

External links 
 MONREAL in the Bernardo Estornés Lasa - Auñamendi Encyclopedia (Euskomedia Fundazioa) 

Municipalities in Navarre